St. Mary's High School is located in Newry, County Down, Northern Ireland.  It is within the Education Authority (Southern) area.

History
The school was established in 1961.

Notable alumni
 Sinéad Bradley, (b. 1972) - politician

References

External links

Catholic secondary schools in Northern Ireland
Education in Newry
Girls' schools in Northern Ireland
Schools in County Down
Secondary schools in County Down
Educational institutions established in 1961